Joyce A. Bender is the CEO, President, and founder of Bender Consulting Services, Inc. Bender also incorporated Bender Consulting Services of Canada, Inc. in 2001. Bender Consulting is headquartered in Pittsburgh, Pennsylvania, and operates in 18 states in the U.S. and 2 provinces in Canada. Bender is an advocate for disability employment and the host of the Internet talk radio show Disability Matters with Joyce Bender on voiceamerica.com. She is the current chair of the board of the National Epilepsy Foundation and the vice-chair on the board of the American Association of People with Disabilities.

Accomplishments 

In 1996, Bender received Carlow University's Woman of Spirit award and in 1998 she was named one of Pennsylvania's 50 Best Women in Business. In 2000, Bender received the 2000 James F. Compton Humanitarian Award for her efforts in improving the quality of life for people with disabilities, by removing barriers to employment and creating other employment opportunities. In 2003, Bender was awarded the New Freedom Initiative Award winner from the Bush Administration. In 1999, Bender was selected as the President's Award winner, an honor given to an American who furthers the employment and empowerment of people with disabilities. In 2005, she received the UCP of Pittsburgh's Gertrude Labowitz Lifetime Achievement Award.

In 2007, Bender received the ACHIEVA's Sattler Humanitarian Award. In 2008, Bender was selected by the YWCA of Greater Pittsburgh as a Tribute to Women Awardee in the Entrepreneur category for her work in empowering women and girls to reach their personal and professional goals. She was also honored with the Diamond Award from the Pittsburgh Business Times.

In September 2002, Bender Consulting received the Employer of the Year Award from the National Epilepsy Foundation. Bender Consulting also received the 1999 Employer of the Year Award from hireAbility in Philadelphia, PA, the 1997 Power of Work Award from Goodwill Industries, and was selected the 1996 Small Employer of the Year by the Pennsylvania Governor's Committee on Employment of People with Disabilities. In 2002, Bender Consulting of Canada received the Diversity in the Workplace Award from the Canadian Paraplegic Association of Ontario.

Affiliations 

Bender serves as chair of the national Epilepsy Foundation board of directors.  She is an executive board member and secretary of the American Association of People with Disabilities.  She is a board member of the Epilepsy Foundation of Western and Central Pennsylvania, Variety the Children's Charity of Pittsburgh, Hill House, The Center for Victims of Violence and Crime, and American Board of Registration of Electroencephalographic and Evoked Potential Technologists.  Additionally, Bender is on the Board of Advisors for the Homeless Children's Education Fund and DeVry University, and a member of the Board of Trustees of Carlow University.

Bender is an executive board member of the Pennsylvania Business Leadership Network, and the president and founder of the Pittsburgh Disability Employment Project for Freedom.

Bender was one of the first regional coordinators for Disability Mentoring Day and coordinates activities in Pennsylvania, Delaware and Toronto.  She is the host of Disability Matters with Joyce Bender, a radio show on voiceamerica.com, and speaks across the United States and Canada.

Media 
In addition to her weekly Internet talk radio show, Disability Matters with Joyce Bender on voiceamerica.com, Bender has been featured in various periodicals including the Pittsburgh Business Times, Investors Business Daily, Pittsburgh Post-Gazette, Chicago Tribune, Computerworld, and Reader’s Digest. She holds a Bachelor of Science degree in psychology from Geneva College.

References

External links 
Bender Consulting Services
Epilepsy Foundation
American Association of People with Disabilities

Living people
American women chief executives
Year of birth missing (living people)
21st-century American women